Fomboni (population approx. 19,000) is the third-largest city in the Comoros. It is also the capital and largest city on the island and the Autonomous Island of Mohéli, of which it makes up more than one third of the population. Characterized as quiet, it is home to an old market and a jetty.

References

Populated places in Mohéli